The 54th Golden Horse Awards took place on November 25, 2017 at the Sun Yat-sen Memorial Hall in Taipei, Taiwan. Organized by the Taipei Golden Horse Film Festival Executive Committee, the awards honored the best in Chinese-language films of 2016 and 2017. The ceremony was televised by TTV.

Winners and nominees 
Winners are listed first, highlighted in boldface.

References

External links
 Official website of the Golden Horse Awards

54th
2017 film awards
2017 in Taiwan